A Bullet Is Waiting is a 1954 American film noir crime western film directed by John Farrow and starring Jean Simmons, Rory Calhoun, Stephen McNally and Brian Aherne.

Plot

A small plane carrying Frank Munson and a handcuffed prisoner, Ed Stone, crashes in the California wilderness. Ed knocks out Frank, unlocks the cuffs and flees, coming upon a woman called Cally tending to sheep, seemingly by herself in a remote cabin.

Frank follows and identifies himself as a Utah lawman who after tracking Ed for nearly two years finally caught up with him. Cally is hesitant to trust either stranger. She is an educated woman whose father, a former Oxford University professor, is living with her but is currently away.

As a torrential rain falls, Ed attempts to escape, but the passage is flooded. Cally tries to warn him, but pulls a knife when Ed tries to rape her. At the cabin, Frank has no weapon and searches for a rifle Cally has hidden.  Ed returns and, while trapped there during the storm, explains to Cally that he shot Frank's brother in self-defense, whereupon Frank had himself deputized but intends to kill him rather than bring him to justice.

Cally's father returns and is startled to find two men there. He hears their stories and, aware that his daughter is falling in love with Ed, offers him a chance to turn himself in to other authorities. With a gun in his hand and a single bullet in the chamber, Ed proves his intent by refusing to shoot Frank when he has the chance. He sets off to surrender himself to the actual police.

Cast
 Jean Simmons as Cally Canham 
 Rory Calhoun as Ed Stone 
 Stephen McNally as Frank Munson 
 Brian Aherne as David Canham

Production
The film was to be the first in three movies starring Jean Simmons produced by Howard Welsch. He took over the contract Simmons had with RKO. Filming started 3 December 1953.

Welsh later sold the remaining two-film-commitment with Simmons to 20th Century Fox.

In April 1954 Welsch signed a deal with Columbia to distribute the film.

Critical Response 
IMDb users have a range of reviews for the film, with some saying the film is worth a watch whereas others say the film is horribly miscast, with the overall score being 5.4/10.

Though not enough reviews to get an official percentage, most users of Rotten Tomatoes gave the film 3 stars.

References

External links

1954 films
1954 crime drama films
American crime drama films
Film noir
Columbia Pictures films
1950s English-language films
Films scored by Dimitri Tiomkin
Films directed by John Farrow
Films set in California
1950s American films